Mictis is a genus of sap-sucking insects in the family Coreidae, with species recorded from India, China, Vietnam and Malesia through to Australia. It was described by William Elford Leach in 1814.

Description
From the original description:

Head immersed even to the eyes within the thorax; vertex with two ocelli placed transversely; antennae filiform, four-jointed, joints cylindric, equal, or with the first joint rather longer.

Anterior four feet alike in size and form; hinder ones with thick thighs and with the internal side of the tibiae dilated; tarsi all three-joined, the first longor than the other two conjoined.

Body elongate, flat above; thorax triangular, very narrow in front; abdomen with dilated sides.

Etymology
The original description gives no explanation of its etymology.

Species 
The Coreoidea species file lists (as of 2022):
 Mictis abstrusa Linnavuori, 1978
 Mictis amboinensis Walker, 1871
 Mictis angusta Hsiao, 1965
 Mictis caja Stål, 1865
 Mictis difficilis Brailovsky & Barrera, 2006
 Mictis dilatipes (Blöte, 1938)
 Mictis discolor Dallas, 1852
 Mictis falloui Reuter, 1888
 Mictis farinulenta Breddin, 1899
 Mictis formidabilis Distant, 1918
 Mictis fuscipes Hsiao, 1963
 Mictis gallina Dallas, 1852
 Mictis javana Walker, 1871
 Mictis longicornis Westwood, 1842
 Mictis macra Stål, 1865
 Mictis oceanensis Distant, 1900
 Mictis profana (Fabricius, 1803) - type species (as Mictis crucifera Leach)
 Mictis pungens Stål, 1871
 Mictis riedeli Brailovsky, 2002
 Mictis rufovittata Walker, 1871
 Mictis serina Dallas, 1852
 Mictis sulawesiana Brailovsky, 2002
 Mictis tenebrosa (Fabricius, 1787)
 Mictis tridentifer Blöte, 1938
 Mictis tuberosa Hsiao, 1965

References

Mictini
Coreidae genera
Hemiptera of Asia